Huzir Sulaiman (born 8 June 1973) is a Malaysian director and actor. He is the co-founder and Joint Artistic Director of Checkpoint Theatre. A critically acclaimed and award-winning playwright, his Collected Plays 1998-2012 was published in 2013. His plays have been translated into German, Japanese, Polish, Indonesian and Mandarin. His essays and commentary pieces have appeared in The Star, The Straits Times and The Huffington Post.

Theatre career 
Sulaiman directing includes Thick Beats for Good Girls (2018), FRAGO (2017), The Good, the Bad and the Sholay (2015), Interrogating the Interrogators: Selected Plays of Chong Tze Chien (2015); #UnicornMoment (2014); the 15th anniversary production of Atomic Jaya (2013); City Night Songs (2012); and The Good, the Bad and the Sholay (2011), for which he was nominated for Best Director in the 2012 Life! Theatre Awards. Huzir was educated at Princeton University, where he won the Bain-Swiggett Poetry Prize and is a Yale World Fellow.

Academic career 
Currently an Adjunct Associate Professor with the National University of Singapore's University Scholars Programme, Huzir has taught playwriting at the National University of Singapore's English Department; the School of the Arts, Singapore; New York University Tisch Asia ; and Nanyang Technological University.

Other career 
He also heads Studio Wong Huzir, a creative consultancy.

For a short time in the early part of the 1990s, he hosted an afternoon talk show on WOW FM, a now-defunct Malaysian radio station. In the 1990s, Huzir also spent a year writing sketches with the Instant Café Theatre Company before starting the Straits Theatre Company in 1996. He began writing plays in 1997. He also dabbled in film writing, writing the screenplay for the Malaysian film Dukun.

He also contributed articles to The Star and The Huffington Post, and involved himself in the publishing of the online magazine POSKOD.SG.

Personal life

Sulaiman's father is Haji Sulaiman Abdullah, who was born G. Srinivasan Iyer, a Tamil Brahmin who later converted to Islam. Sulaiman is a veteran lawyer who served as Malaysian Bar Council president. His mother is Hajjah Mehrun Siraj, who had served as professor, lawyer, consultant for United Nations agencies, NGO activists and a Commissioner with the Human Rights Commission of Malaysia. She died in June 2021.

Sulaiman married Claire Wong, a lawyer, actor and director, in 2004. Sulaiman is a permanent resident in Singapore.

Director

Plays

Screenplays

Publications
 Eight Plays (2002, Silverfish Books) 
 Huzir Sulaiman: Collected Plays, 1998-2012 (2013, Checkpoint Theatre)

References

 In tandem with the nation, The Star, 5 August 2007.
 , kakiseni.com, "8 Brilliant Plays in 4 Tumultuous Years" by Antares, 11 December 2002.

External links
 

1973 births
Living people
Malaysian people of Indian descent
Malaysian dramatists and playwrights
Malaysian writers
Malaysian male actors
Malaysian emigrants to Singapore